Francis Drake (1764–1821), of Yardbury and Wells, was a British diplomat, holding positions at Genoa and Munich during the Napoleonic Wars.

Francis Drake was the son of Rev. Francis Drake, Vicar of Seaton and Beer. In 1790 Drake was appointed Secretary of Legation to the Court of Copenhagen., moving on to be Minister Resident at Venice before becoming envoy to Genoa in 1793. He took leave to return from Genoa to England to marry in 1795.  In 1799 he was appointed Envoy Extraordinary to the Elector Palatine, and Minister to the Diet of Ratisbon. He kept up correspondence with French informants, and in 1804 was politically embarrassed when some letters, revealing the plans of Charles Pichegru and Georges Cadoudal to mount an uprising on the left bank of  the Rhine, were intercepted by the French government and circulated to foreign ministers in Paris.

References

External links

Papers of Francis Drake of Yardbury and Wells at Somerset Record Office

1764 births
1821 deaths
British people of the Napoleonic Wars
Ambassadors of Great Britain to Denmark
Ambassadors of Great Britain to the Republic of Venice
British expatriates in Germany